Ferma is the name of several rural localities in Russia:
Ferma, Novosibirsk Oblast, a railway halt platform in Moshkovsky District of Novosibirsk Oblast
Ferma, Perm Krai, a settlement in Permsky District of Perm Krai
Ferma, Saratov Oblast, a khutor in Saratovsky District of Saratov Oblast